Vujičić is a village in the municipality of Brčko, Bosnia and Herzegovina.

The former name of the village was Vujičići and is the plural form for the surname Vujčić.

Demographics 
According to the 2013 census, its population was 45.

References

Villages in Brčko District